The Long March, also known as Changzheng, was a military retreat undertaken by the Red Army of the Communist Party of China from 1934 to 1935.

Changzheng may also refer to:
 Changzheng, Guizhou (zh), town in and subdivision of Honghuagang District, Zunyi, Guizhou
 Changzheng, Hainan (zh), town in and subdivision of Qiongzhong Li and Miao Autonomous County, Hainan
 Changzheng, Shanghai, town in and subdivision of Putuo District, Shanghai
 Changzheng Subdistrict, Baiyin (zh), subdivision of Pingchuan District, Baiyin, Gansu
 Changzheng Subdistrict, Shangqiu (zh), subdivision of Liangyuan District, Shangqiu, Henan
 Changzheng Subdistrict, Liaoyang (zh), subdivision of Hongwei District, Liaoyang, Liaoning
 Changzheng Street Subdistrict (zh), subdivision of Xinfu District, Xinzhou, Shanxi

See also 
 Long March (rocket family)